Revolverheld (German for "gunslinger") is a German rock band from Hamburg, Germany.
Originally formed under the name Manga in 2002, the band renamed in 2004 to "Tsunamikiller" and later decided upon the current name after the 2004 Indian Ocean earthquake.

Band history

Revolverheld began their career as a supporting act for Donots, Silbermond and Udo Lindenberg. They first started gathering public attention with their song "Rock n' Roll", which then led to a Coaching Program in the Pop-Academy Baden-Württemberg. Then in 2004 they were signed by the record label Sony BMG.
Their first single called "Generation Rock" was released in June 2005 and directly entered the German Charts. The song is featured on the video game Guitar Hero III: Legends of Rock. Together with the producer Clemens Matznick their first album (Revolverheld) was produced, and came out in September 2005.

On 7 July 2007 the band performed at the German leg of Live Earth in Hamburg.

"Helden 2008" was recorded as a dedication to UEFA Euro 2008. The single features a music video of the band members dressed as team members, with cut scenes of them performing in the locker room showers.
By the success of the song, "Helden 2008" was the 34th best-selling song of 2008 in Germany.

On 30 November 2012, Revolverheld announced on their website that Florian Speer had left the band and has been replaced by Chris Rodriguez.

Discography

Studio albums

Singles

Awards and certifications
 Eins Live Krone – Best Newcomer (2006)
 Platin-Schallplatte (Platinum Record) – Platinum for "Revolverheld" (LP) (2013)
 Platin-Schallplatte (Platinum Record) – Platinum for "Halt dich an mir fest" (Single) (2015)
 Echo – Best National Rock/Pop Band for Immer in Bewegung (2015)

References

German rock music groups
Participants in the Bundesvision Song Contest
Musical groups from Hamburg
MTV Europe Music Award winners